Kristine Elisabeth Heuch Bonnevie (8 October 1872 – 30 August 1948) was a Norwegian biologist, Norway's first female professor, women's rights activist and politician for the Free-minded Liberal Party. Her fields of research were cytology, genetics and embryology. She was among the first women to be elected to political positions in Norway.

Personal life
She was the fifth of seven children to Jacob Aall Bonnevie (1838–1904) and Anne Johanne Daae (1839–1876). Jacob Aall Bonnevie had his eighth and ninth children with his second wife Susanne Bryn (1848–1927). Her family moved from Trondhjem to Kristiania in 1886.

Her father was opposed to women in academia and
thought that women's place was in the home. However, these views did not prevent her from studying.

Bonnevie never married. Her sister Honoria, the eldest child of Jacob and Anne, married Norwegian physicist and meteorologist Vilhelm Bjerknes.

Education
When Kristine grew up women in Norway were not allowed to go to public schools. Because of this, she began her academical career at a private school. After passing her examen artium in 1892, she began medicine studies at the University of Kristiania (now the University of Oslo), as women had just been granted the right to study in Norway in 1884, as a result of the other Scandinavian countries allowing this a few years earlier. She soon figured out that medicine was not for her, so she changed fields of study to zoology in 1892 as Johan Hjorts student, more specifically in the fields of marine biology. She did many scientific travels around Europe and the US. She received an internship and went to Zürich from 1898–1899 to work under the professor Arnold Lang. Here she mainly researched cytological techniques in the laboratory. She also went to the German embryologist, Theodor Boveri in Würzburg, Germany, from 1900 to 1901. After her stay in Würzburg, her interests changed towards cytology and cell biology. Here she studied meiosis in different species of invertebrates. Here she discovered an interesting anomalous model, different from the assumed universa process in the division of these cells. This discovery aroused interest among her colleagues.

The studies she carried out in Würzburg were the main focus on her doctoral thesis. She completed her doctoral dissertation, "Undersøgelser over kimcellerne hos Enteroxenos østergreni" (studies on the germ cells of Enteroxenos østergreni) in 1906, becoming the first woman to get a PhD in scientific studies at a Norwegian university.

She also spent two semesters at Columbia University in New York from 1906 to 1907. Here she carried out meticulous laboratory work, mainly dedicated to the analysis of sex chromosomes, achieving excellent results together with the respected zoologist and embryologist Edmund B. Wilson from the University of Columbia.

Academic career
After her return from Zürich in 1901, she applied for a position as a curator at the university's museum as the position had just become vacant. She was the only woman applying for the job, and her former teacher and the director of the Laboratory of Zoology, Georg Sars, recommended her for the position and stated that her being a woman should not be an obstacle. After tough competition the job was hers, succeeding Johan Hjort as the curator of the Zoological Museum at the University of Oslo in 1900.

At the time, Norwegian law prohibited women from holding positions of office, but she was allowed to be a professor of Bergen Museum, a foundation at the time. Here she was nominated to a professor position in 1910. Her colleagues Georg Sars and Robert Collett were afraid to lose the efficient and academically strong Bonnevie, and influenced the Parliament to pass the Act of February 9, 1912, also called "Lex Bonnevie". This act granted women the same right as men to hold positions as professors at a university in Norway.

She was a professor at Royal Frederick University from 1912 to 1937, and founded the Institute of Inheritance Research in 1916.

In 1911, Bonnevie became the first female member of the Norwegian Academy of Science and Letters. Later, she founded the Norwegian Association for Female Academics, leading it from 1922 to 1925. She established a study home for young girls in 1916 and a students' house in 1923. Bonnevie was a member of the University's broadcasting committee from 1927 to 1937. Her students included Thordar Quelprud and Thor Heyerdahl.

In 1914, Bonnevie began researching genetics and hereditary abnormalities. She was especially interested in twin births and examined if this could be hereditary. She proved that polydactyly had a clear hereditary component.

Bonnevie established the Institute for Hereditary Research in 1916, later known as Institute of Genetics. She was a director and professor here until her retirement in 1937.

Bonnevie also researched fingerprints to see if they had some hereditary components. Originally, the research intended to see if fingerprints could prove paternity cases. However, Bonnevie concluded that this was not the case. She then researched a possible connection between fingerprints and mental capabilities - a popular idea during this time. Her results were all negative and showed no relation between fingerprints and IQ.

Her last research within genetics centered around genetic dysfunctions in mice that made them twitch. She analysed how this phenomenon was inherited and studied the mice's brains. She proved that this was hereditary and caused by water accumulations in the brain.

Even after her retirement in 1937, she kept working and researching. Her last article was accepted for publishing the day before she died in 1948, at 76 years old. This article is still cited.

Bonnevie received the King's Medal of Merit in gold in 1920, the Order of St. Olav, 1st class, in 1946, and "Fridtjof Nansen's reward" in 1935. The biology building on Blindern at the University of Oslo is named Kristine Bonnevie's House.

Between 1922 and 1933, Bonnevie contributes to the works of the Committee on Intellectual Cooperation of the League of Nations (with Henri Bergson, Albert Einstein, Marie Curie etc.).

Student welfare 

Kristine Bonnevie was one of the initiators of the student canteens Aulakjelleren and Blindernkjelleren at the University of Oslo. She never had children of her own, but she cared a great deal about the students and their welfare. She was also interested in promoting the interests of female scientists. Thanks to her initiative, several residences for female students were created in Oslo from 1916. Some years later, in 1920, she stood out as one of the founders of the Association of University Women, where she was the first president. From this position, she had the opportunity to host the Third International Congress of the Federation of University Women, held in 1924 in Oslo.

During World War I, she organised food and shelter for students from other parts of Norway. She even rented fields to grow vegetables. During World War II she distributed food from her apartment to students after the Nazis closed the university in 1943.

Politics 
Bonnevie was a central board member of the Liberal Left Party from 1909 to 1918. She was elected as a member of Kristiania city council, serving from 1908 to 1919, and as a deputy representative to the Parliament of Norway in 1915. She served the term 1916–1918 as the deputy of Otto Bahr Halvorsen in the constituency Gamle Aker.

She was a member of the Norwegian Association for Women's Rights, where her sister-in-law, Margarete Bonnevie, was a leader from 1936.

Legacy 
In memory of Kristine Bonnevie, the biology building at the University of Oslo is named after her. A research vessel belonging to the Norwegian Institute of Marine Research is named FF "Kristine Bonnevie" after Bonnevie, due to her interest in marine biology. Oslo, Stavanger, and Sola have streets named after Bonnevie.

Taxonomy 
Bonnevie discovered and classified some new species of animals as Enteroxenos oestergreni (fam. Eulimidae), Thuiaria arctica (fam. Sertulariidae) and Ciona gelatinosa (fam. Cionidae). She also wrote the original description  of genus as Enteroxenos and Eupterotrachea.

See also
Timeline of women in science

References

Further reading

External links 
Family genealogy

1872 births
1948 deaths
20th-century Norwegian women scientists
Norwegian biologists
Academic staff of the University of Oslo
Members of the Norwegian Academy of Science and Letters
Recipients of the King's Medal of Merit in gold
Politicians from Oslo
Free-minded Liberal Party politicians
20th-century Norwegian politicians
Deputy members of the Storting
Norwegian people of French descent
Women members of the Storting
Norwegian women academics
Norwegian geneticists
Women geneticists
20th-century Norwegian women politicians
Kristine
Norwegian Association for Women's Rights people